Madilyn "Bubba" Ida-Marie Nickles (born March 8, 1998) is an American, former collegiate All-American, softball utility player. She played college softball for the UCLA Bruins and won a national championship in 2019. She represented the United States at the 2020 Summer Olympics and won a silver medal.

Career
Nickles competes with the UCLA Bruins softball team and has been named a two-time Second Team and First Team All-Pac-12 player. She was also chosen a National Fastpitch Coaches Association First Team All-American as a junior, where she also helped lead the Bruins to the 2019 NCAA Division I National Championship.

Team USA
Nickles played for two seasons with Team USA and was named to the roster for the 2020 Summer Olympics, where she won a silver medal Nickles had a hit in two appearances during the tournament. Nickles did not play in the gold medal game, where Team USA was defeated by Team Japan 2–0.

Statistics

References

External links

1998 births
Living people
UCLA Bruins softball players
People from Merced, California
Softball players from California
Olympic softball players of the United States
Softball players at the 2020 Summer Olympics
Medalists at the 2020 Summer Olympics
Olympic silver medalists for the United States in softball
Olympic medalists in softball
Competitors at the 2022 World Games
World Games gold medalists
World Games medalists in softball